Laco is a Norwegian holding company with investments in marine activities.

Laco or LACO may also refer to:
Laco (acronym of Lacher & Co, German watch manufacturer, Pforzheim)
Los Angeles Chamber Orchestra

People with the given name or surname Laco include:
Cornelius Laco (died 69 AD), prefect of the Roman imperial bodyguard
Laco Lučenič (born 1952), Slovak musician and music producer
Laco Déczi (born 1938), Slovak American jazz trumpeter and composer
Teodor Laço (1936–2016), Albanian writer and diplomat